Jefferson High School is a continuation high school located in Mt. Shasta, California.  It is a member of the Siskiyou Union High School District.

References

External links
 
 Siskiyou Union High School District website

Public high schools in California
Mount Shasta, California (city)
Schools in Siskiyou County, California